"High Time" is the third and final single from the 1983 album, Kilroy Was Here, by Styx. It reached number 48 on the U.S. Billboard Hot 100 singles chart.  In a 2009 interview, Dennis DeYoung revealed that "High Time" was released as the third single at the last minute by A&M Records. An expensive video for "Haven't We Been Here Before" was created prior to Shaw's issues and never was shown on MTV. Instead, Shaw wanted a live version of "Cold War" to be the third single. A&M Records finally released "High Time" as the single, with little promotion and no video. Its relative poor performance killed momentum on the "Kilroy" album.

Cash Box called it a "preachy condemnation of morality mongers" and a "strong defense of freedom of expression."

References

1983 songs
1983 singles
Styx (band) songs
Songs written by Dennis DeYoung
A&M Records singles